Duboc Fortress is situated above the Ceçan, part of the Ciçavica mountain chain, in the village of Duboc, approximately 10–12 km in the south-west of the Municipality of Vushtrri.

History 
Duboc Fortress is a location of the Dardanic cultural group of the 8th and 9th centuries BCE Based on the findings of the cultural layers in this location, the discovered archaeological exhibits show about two different civilizations. Civilization A is in the lower layers underneath the civilization B, and the civilization B is in the upper layers.
Civilization B or the Duboc Fortress is located in the Mountain of the Town, (alb. "Mali i Gjytetit") from the north-east to the west.
The length of the wall of the Duboc fortress is 900 meters, with the width of 2–4 meters, the height it is not known. The town of Duboc had two pairs of doors facing each other. In this fortress were found ceramics with ornaments of the illyrian ethnographic fond, bricks, and marble objects with inscriptions.
From the paleolithic period there were found chisels made of pigs teeth. From the neolithic period were found different types of jewelry: earrings, and coins.

See also 
 Illyria
 Dardania
 Archaeology of Kosovo
 List of settlements in Illyria

References

External links 
 Duboc Fortress (Vushtrri)

Duboc Fortress
Illyrian Kosovo
Dardanians
Dardania (Roman province)
Cultural heritage monuments in Vushtrri